César García may refer to:

 César García (footballer, born 1993), Dominican footballer
 César García (footballer, born 1999), Spanish footballer
 César García (cyclist) (born 1974), Spanish former cyclist

See also 
 Cesar Garcia, former director-general of the National Intelligence Coordinating Agency of the Philippines
 Cesar Garcia (curator) (born 1985), Mexican-born American scholar, writer, curator
 Cesar Garcia (soccer) (born 2002), American professional soccer player